Hadi Abdul Jabbar (born 26 January 1930) is an Iraqi retired weightlifter. He competed in the 1960 and 1964 Summer Olympics.

References

External links

1930 births
Possibly living people
Weightlifters at the 1960 Summer Olympics
Weightlifters at the 1964 Summer Olympics
Iraqi male weightlifters
Olympic weightlifters of Iraq
Sportspeople from Baghdad